The 2011 Dally M Awards were presented on Tuesday 6 September 2011 at the Entertainment Quarter in Sydney and broadcast on Fox Sports.

Dally M Medal
The Dally M Medallion was presented by Australian former rugby league footballer, Robert Laurie.

Dally M Player of the Year: Billy Slater

Player votes tally – Top 10

Dally M Awards
The Dally M Awards were, as usual, conducted at the close of the regular season and hence do not take games played in the finals series into account. The Dally M Medal is for the official player of the year while the Provan-Summons Medal is for the fans' of "people's choice" player of the year.

Team of the Year

See also
Dally M Awards
Dally M Medal
2011 NRL season

References

2011 sports awards
2011 NRL season
2011